Shigekazu Mori (森 繁和, born November 18, 1954 in Chosei, Chiba Prefecture) is a former Japanese professional baseball pitcher who played for the Seibu Lions in Japan's Nippon Professional Baseball.

He has held coaching positions at 4 different teams most notably including a 10 years stint at the Seibu Lions and 10 years at current employers, the Chunichi Dragons.

On 9 August 2016 it was announced that Mori would become the interim manager of the Dragons following the dismissal of Motonobu Tanishige.

On 29 September 2016, following the end of the 2016 NPB season where the Dragons finished last in the Central League, Mori was announced as permanent full-time manager for the 2017 season.

External links

Dragons.jp

References

1954 births
Living people
Komazawa University alumni
Japanese baseball players
Nippon Professional Baseball pitchers
Seibu Lions players
Managers of baseball teams in Japan
Chunichi Dragons managers
Baseball people from Chiba Prefecture